Torrelabad is a hamlet located in the municipality of Graus, in Huesca province, Aragon, Spain. As of 2020, it has a population of 19.

Geography 
Torrelabad is located 96km east of Huesca.

References

Populated places in the Province of Huesca